Sir Edmund Constantine Henry Phipps,  (15 March 1840 – 15 March 1911) was a British diplomat.

Career
Phipps was educated at Harrow School and later entered the Diplomatic Service in 1858.

In 1873, he was Third Secretary in Rio de Janeiro and was requested by the Ambassador, George Buckley Mathew, to report on the condition of British emigrants in Brazil.

In 1881, Phipps was promoted from the rank of Second Secretary to be Consul-General at Budapest with the rank of Secretary of Legation, and in 1885 was posted to be Secretary of the Embassy at Vienna. 
In 1892 he was appointed Secretary of the Embassy at Paris and in the following year promoted to be Minister Plenipotentiary under the Ambassador to France, the Marquess of Dufferin and Ava.

While in Paris, Phipps was a British delegate to an international conference on the prevention of cholera, in 1894.  He was made a Companion of the Bath in the Queen's 1894 Birthday Honours.   In the same year he was appointed British Ambassador to Brazil.

In 1900 Phipps was appointed Envoy Extraordinary and Minister Plenipotentiary at the Court of His Majesty the King of the Belgians. He was knighted as a Knight Commander of the Order of St Michael and St George (KCMG) in the 1902 Coronation Honours list "for services in connection with the Sugar Conference", and invested as such by King Edward VII at Buckingham Palace on 24 October 1902. This was the Brussels Sugar Convention of 5 March 1902, which was controversial in Britain and was opposed by Henry Campbell-Bannerman amongst others. Phipps retired from the Diplomatic Service in 1906 and died in 1911.

Personal life
Constantine Phipps was the only son of the Hon Edmund Phipps and Maria-Louisa Phipps (née Campbell); this being her second marriage, after the death of her first husband,  Charles Francis Norton.

Phipps was the grandson of Henry Phipps, 1st Earl of Mulgrave. His maternal grandfather was Lieutenant General Sir Colin Campbell. In 1863 he married Maria Miller Mundy, daughter of Alfred Miller Mundy, of Shipley Hall, Derbyshire, and his wife Maria Jane, daughter of Rear-Admiral Sir John Hindmarsh. Their son Eric Phipps became a diplomat in his turn, serving in the 1930s as ambassador successively to Berlin and Paris. Lady (Maria) Phipps died on 30 August 1902, and in 1904 he married Alexandra Wassilewna, widow of Gomez Brandão of Rio de Janeiro, who died in 1954.

References

1840 births
1911 deaths
People educated at Harrow School
Knights Commander of the Order of St Michael and St George
Companions of the Order of the Bath
Ambassadors of the United Kingdom to Brazil
Ambassadors of the United Kingdom to Belgium
Constantine